NKM may refer to:

 Nagoya Airfield in Japan
 Nathalie Kosciusko-Morizet, French politician
 Namkon railway station, Jharkhand, India